Ivan Warner (February 18, 1919 – January 26, 1994) was an American lawyer and politician in New York.

Life
He was born on February 18, 1919, in Manhattan, New York City, the son of immigrants from Saint Kitts. He dropped out of Morris Evening High School, and worked as a clerk for the New York City Rent Commission. In 1949, he was hired by Congressman Isidore Dollinger as an aide, and went to Washington, D.C. While working for Dollinger, he completed his education in the evenings at the American University. Then he studied law at Brooklyn Law School, was admitted to the bar in 1955, and practiced law in New York City.

Warner was elected on January 14, 1958, to the New York State Assembly (Bronx Co., 6th D.), to fill the vacancy caused by the appointment of Walter H. Gladwin as a City Magistrate. He was re-elected in November 1958, and remained in the Assembly until 1960, sitting in the 171st and 172nd New York State Legislatures.

He was a member of the New York State Senate (27th D.) from 1961 to 1965, sitting in the 173rd, 174th and 175th New York State Legislatures. He was a delegate to the 1964 Democratic National Convention. In September 1965, he ran in the Democratic primary for Borough President of the Bronx, but was defeated by Herman Badillo.

Warner was again a member of the State Senate (31st D.) in 1967 and 1968. In November 1968, he was elected to the New York Supreme Court, and remained on the bench until his death in 1994. During his tenure, he went to live in New Rochelle.

He died on January 26, 1994, in Memorial Sloan Kettering Cancer Center in Manhattan, of cancer.

Sources

1919 births
1994 deaths
People from Manhattan
Politicians from New Rochelle, New York
Democratic Party New York (state) state senators
American University alumni
Brooklyn Law School alumni
New York Supreme Court Justices
African-American judges
Democratic Party members of the New York State Assembly
20th-century American judges
Lawyers from New Rochelle, New York
Politicians from the Bronx
20th-century American politicians
20th-century American lawyers
20th-century African-American politicians
American people of Saint Kitts and Nevis descent